The giant solenodon (Solenodon arredondoi) is an extinct species of soricomorph that occurred in western Cuba. A larger animal than the still-extant Cuban solenodon (Atopogale cubana), the species is believed to have been eradicated through habitat destruction and the introduction of predatory dogs to Cuba by pre-Columbian people.

References

Solenodon
Holocene extinctions
Extinct mammals
Extinct animals of Cuba
Venomous mammals
Mammals of Cuba
Mammals of the Caribbean
Mammals described in 1993
Mammal extinctions since 1500
Endemic fauna of Cuba